Jorunna funebris, commonly called the dotted nudibranch, is a large species of sea slug. It is a dorid nudibranch, meaning it is a shell-less marine gastropod mollusc in the family Discodorididae. The genus Jorunna is composed of roughly 15 other species of nudibranchs, which feed on a variety of sponges.

Distribution
This species was described from Sri Lanka. It is widespread in the Indo-Pacific region from the Red Sea and the Indian Ocean along the East African coast to Australia and New Caledonia. Jorunna funebris preys exclusively on sponge in the genus Xestospongia, and as such, the sea slug's distribution aligns closely with the distribution of Xestospongia.

Chemistry of Jorunna funebris 
This species contains a chemical compound called "jorumycin," which shares the same tetrahydroisoquinoline backbone as an anti-tumor drug called Zalypsis, or PM00104. In addition, another compound called jorunnamycin A, has been found alongside fennebricins A (1) and B (5), both of which are bis-tetrahydroisoquinolinequinones and related to two classes of anti-tumor alkaloids.

References

Further reading
 Vine, P. (1986). Red Sea Invertebrates. Immel Publishing, London. 224 pp
 Branch, G.M. et al. (2002). Two Oceans. 5th impression. David Philip, Cape Town & Johannesburg.

External links
 

Discodorididae
Gastropods described in 1858